Elephant Jokes is the 12th studio album released by singer-songwriter Robert Pollard on August 11, 2009, and the 8th full-length album to be released by Pollard (along with several EPs and singles) since the break-up of his band Guided by Voices in 2004. Unlike recent Pollard albums, Todd Tobias does not play all the instruments on Elephant Jokes, as Pollard plays some guitar on this album.

Track listing
 "Things Have Changed (Down in Mexico City)" - 1:57
 "Johnny Optimist" - 2:54
 "When a Man Walks Away" - 1:49
 "Parts of Your World" - 1:45
 "Symbols and Heads" - 2:08
 "I Felt Revolved" - 1:44
 "Epic Heads" - 1:37
 "Stiff Me" - 2:16
 "Compound X" - 1:36
 "Accident Hero" - 1:38
 "Tattered Lily" - 3:37
 "Hippsville (Where the Frisbees Fly Forever)" - 1:11
 "Newly Selected Dirt Spots" - 1:17
 "Jimmy" - 1:53
 "Pigeon Tripping" - 1:36
 "Spectrum Factory" - 1:53
 "Perverted Eyelash" - 1:36
 "Cosmic Yellow Children" - 2:20
 "Blown Out Man" - 2:31
 "Desiring" - 2:31
 "(All You Need) To Know" - 3:44
 "Architectural Nightmare Man" - 2:33

References

2009 albums
Robert Pollard albums